Mirga Gražinytė-Tyla (born Mirga Gražinytė, 2 April 1986 in Vilnius) is a Lithuanian conductor.  She is currently musical director of the City of Birmingham Symphony Orchestra (CBSO).

Biography

Early years and education
Gražinytė-Tyla was born in Vilnius, Lithuania. Her father, Romualdas Gražinis, is a choir conductor affiliated with the Aidija Chamber Choir in Vilnius.  Her mother Sigutė Gražinienė is a pianist and singer. Her grandmother Beata Vasiliauskaitė-Šmidtienė was a violinist.  Her great-uncle was an organist, and her great-aunt was a composer.  The oldest of three siblings, her sister Onutė Gražinytė is a pianist, and she has a younger brother, Adomas Gražinis.

As a child, Gražinytė-Tyla received her initial education in French and painting, and studied at the National M. K. Čiurlionis School of Art in Vilnius.  At age 11, she decided that she wanted to study music, and the one remaining musical programme option was choral conducting.  She subsequently received musical training and education without ever playing a musical instrument.  She first conducted a choir at age 13. She subsequently continued music studies at the University of Music and Performing Arts Graz, where her instructors included Johannes Prinz, and completed her degree in 2007.  She subsequently studied conducting at the Music Conservatory Felix Mendelssohn-Bartholdy in Leipzig with Ulrich Windfuhr and the Music Conservatory in Zurich (where her mentors included Johannes Schlaefli). Gražinytė-Tyla chose to add the word 'Tyla', Lithuanian for 'silence', to form her professional name.

Career

Gražinytė-Tyla became Second Kapellmeister (2. Kapellmeisterin) at the Theater Heidelberg in the 2011–2012 season.  In 2012, she won the Nestlé and Salzburg Young Conductors Competition.  With the 2013–2014 season, she became First Kapellmeister (1. Kapellmeisterin) at the Bern Opera. Gražinytė-Tyla became music director of the Salzburger Landestheater with the 2015–2016 season, with an initial contract of 2 seasons. She concluded her music directorship of the Salzburger Landestheater after the 2016–2017 season.

In the US, Gražinytė-Tyla was a Gustavo Dudamel Fellow of the Los Angeles Philharmonic for the 2012–2013 season.  In July 2014, she was named the orchestra's assistant conductor, on a 2-year contract. In August 2015, the orchestra named her its new associate conductor, effective with the end of the 2015–2016 season, contracted through 2017.

In July 2015, Gražinytė-Tyla first guest-conducted the City of Birmingham Symphony Orchestra (CBSO). She was subsequently engaged for an additional concert with the CBSO in January 2016. In February 2016, the CBSO named her as its next music director, effective September 2016, with an initial contract of 3 years. She conducted her first concert as CBSO music director on 26 August 2016 in Birmingham, and made her first appearance at The Proms the following evening, 27 August 2016.  Gražinytė-Tyla is the first female conductor to be named music director of the CBSO.  In May 2018, the CBSO announced the extension of Gražinytė-Tyla's contract as its music director through the 2020–2021 season.  In January 2021, the CBSO announced that Gražinytė-Tyla is to conclude her tenure as CBSO music director after the 2021–2022 season, and subsequently to take on the post of principal guest conductor of the CBSO.

In February 2019, Gražinytė-Tyla signed an exclusive long-term recording contract with Deutsche Grammophon (DG).  She is the first female conductor ever to sign an exclusive recording contract with DG.  Her first DG recording, issued in 2019, was of symphonies of Mieczysław Weinberg, with the CBSO.  In October 2020, it won the 'Album of the Year' prize at the annual Gramophone Awards.  Her following DG albums include works by Raminta Šerkšnytė, Benjamin Britten, Ralph Vaughan-Williams, William Walton.

Personal life
Gražinytė-Tyla's partner is principal percussionist with the Heidelberg Symphony Orchestra.  The couple have two sons (one born on 26 August 2018, and the other born in August 2020).  The family maintains a residence in Salzburg.

References

External links
 Official website of Mirga Gražinytė-Tyla
 Künstleragentur Dr. Raab & Dr. Böhm agency biography of Mirga Gražinytė-Tyla
 Columbia Artists Management Inc agency page on Mirga Gražinytė-Tyla
 Ann Drinan and Alexandra Kudukis, "An Interview with Mirga Gražinytė-Tyla, Los Angeles’ New Assistant Conductor".  Polyphonic.org webpage, 20 July 2015

1986 births
Deutsche Grammophon artists
Living people
Lithuanian conductors (music)
Women conductors (music)
21st-century conductors (music)
Musicians from Vilnius